Kata'ib Hezbollah—or the Hezbollah Battalions—is a radical Iraqi Shiite paramilitary group which is part of the Popular Mobilization Forces backed by Iran. During the Iraq War (2003–11), the group fought against Coalition forces. It has been active in the War in Iraq (2013–2017) and the Syrian civil war (2011–present). The group was commanded by Abu Mahdi al-Muhandis until he was killed by a US drone strike in Baghdad on 3 January 2020. Thereafter, he was replaced by Abdul Aziz al-Muhammadawi (Abu Fadak), as the new leader of the Popular Mobilization Forces (PMF). The KH militia, which operates according to the model of Lebanese Hezbollah, works to advance the regional and international interests of Iran in Iraq and the region. It takes a central part in carrying out attacks against U.S. targets in Iraq and acts as part of the Axis of Resistance.

Kata'ib Hezbollah is officially listed as a terrorist organization by the governments of Japan, United Arab Emirates, and the United States.

History

Formation
Kata'ib Hezbollah (KH) was established in March 2003 as a result of a union between several pro-Iranian groups following the invasion of Iraq by the US and UK that overthrew the regime of Saddam Hussein. The conflict continued for much of the next decade as an insurgency emerged to oppose the Coalition forces and the post-invasion Iraqi government.

The group was founded by Jamal Jafaar al-Ibrahim, known as Abu Mahdi al-Muhandis, an Iraqi-Iranian dual national designated as terrorist in 2009. Its first members were from the Badr Organization. The group's structure is secretive, but al-Muhandis, an adviser to IRGC’s Quds Force and former Badr Organization member, was known to be a senior figure in the group, and its commander. The group is directly subordinate to the Quds Force and operates under its instructions and guidance. The US State Department also claimed Lebanon-based Hezbollah provided weapons and training for the group.

Iraqi insurgency (2003–2011)
The group came to prominence in 2007 for attacks against U.S.-led Coalition forces in Iraq, and was known for uploading its videos of attacks on American forces on the internet. The militia's main tactics were to fire rockets and mortar shells at U.S. bases and detonate roadside bombs along routes where the forces moved.

On 15 March 2007, four U.S. soldiers were killed in eastern Baghdad when IEDs planted by Kata'ib Hezbollah detonated near their unit.

On 4 June 2008, Kata'ib Hezbollah conducted a rocket attack that was meant to target Coalition forces but instead killed 18 civilians in Baghdad.

In mid-2008, U.S. and Iraqi forces launched a crackdown against the group and the "Special Groups", the US military term for Iran-backed militias in Iraq. At least 30 of its members were captured during those months. Many of the group's leaders were also captured and US officials claimed that "as result much of the leadership fled to Iran".

On 2 July 2009, the group was added to the U.S. State Department list of Foreign Terrorist Organizations. The group was held responsible for numerous IED attacks, mortar, rocket and RPG attacks as well as sniper operations, targeting US and Iraqi forces, including a November 2008 rocket attack that killed two U.N. workers.

In December 2009, the group intercepted the unencrypted video feed of MQ-1 Predator UAVs above Iraq.

Twelve people were arrested, it said. "The joint security team was fired upon by individuals dispersed in multiple residential buildings ... members of the security team returned fire, killing individuals assessed to be enemy combatants," the military said in a statement. The Provincial Iraqi officials said many of the dead were innocent bystanders, and demanded compensation. They said eight people were killed.

On 13 July 2010, General Ray Odierno named Kata'ib Hezbollah as being behind threats against American bases in Iraq. "In the last couple weeks there's been an increased threat ... and so we've increased our security on some of our bases," Odierno told reporters at a briefing in Baghdad.

On 6 June 2011, Kata'ib Hezbollah militants fired rockets at Forward Operating Base Loyalty in eastern Baghdad killing six U.S. soldiers. Another five soldiers were also wounded in the attack.

On 29 June 2011, Kata'ib Hezbollah fired IRAM rockets that struck a US base near the Iranian border - COP Shocker. The attack resulted in the deaths of three American soldiers. A videotape of the rocket attack was published on the internet by the militia.

In July 2011, an Iraqi intelligence official estimated the group's size at 1,000 fighters and said the militants were paid between $300 to $500 per month.

The Al-Qa'im border crossing has seen hastened military activity as the group is expected to play an important military and security role as the crossing with Syria is officially opened on September 30, 2019.

Post-US withdrawal 
In 2013, Kata'ib Hezbollah and other Iraqi Shia militias acknowledged sending fighters to Syria to fight alongside forces loyal to President Bashar al-Assad, against the Sunni rebels seeking to overthrow him in the Syrian Civil War.

Wathiq al-Batat, a former Kata'ib Hezbollah leader, announced the creation of a new Shia militia, the Mukhtar Army, on 4 February 2013, saying its aim is to defend Shiites and help the government combat terrorism.

In 2014, the group began taking a role in the fight against ISIL in Iraq. Also in 2014, they and six other predominantly Shia Iraqi paramilitary groups formed the Popular Mobilization Forces (PMF). Since October 2016, Kata'ib Hezbollah along with the Iraqi army and other PMF groups has taken part in the Battle of Mosul against ISIL. They have been, alongside other PMF, active in fighting around Tal Afar, severing ISIL's link from Mosul and Tal Afar to the rest of their territory.

During protests in Iraq in 2019, Kata'ib Hezbollah militiamen were reportedly involved in abducting and murdering hundreds of peaceful protesters.

On 29 December 2019, the United States bombed the headquarters of Kata'ib Hezbollah near Al-Qa'im. The airstrikes targeted three Kata'ib Hezbollah locations in Iraq and two in Syria, and included weapons depots and command posts, according to Reuters and a US military statement. The attack was in retaliation after a barrage of over 30 rockets were fired towards the K-1 base two days earlier and other attacks on bases with US forces in Iraq. The earlier attack killed a US contractor and wounded several Iraqi and US soldiers. Twenty-five people were reportedly killed in the US airstrikes and 51 members wounded.

In response to the American bombing of the Kata'ib Hezbollah headquarters on 29 December, protesters attacked the US embassy in the Green Zone in Baghdad on 31 December 2019. Many of the protesters were members of the Kata'ib Hezbollah militia, including Kata'ib Hezbollah commander Abu Mahdi al-Muhandis. Secretary of Defense Mark Esper warned on 2 January that the group may be planning new attacks in Iraq, and that the U.S. is prepared to launch preemptive attacks. Abu Mahdi al-Muhandis was killed by a US drone strike at the Baghdad International Airport on 3 January 2020.

On 27 February 2020, the U.S. State and Treasury departments designated Ahmad al-Hamidawi, the secretary general of Kataib Hezbollah, as a "Specially Designated Global Terrorist."

In March 2020, U.S. launched air raids against Kata'ib Hezbollah facilities in Karbala in retaliation for the Camp Taji attacks.

On 25 June 2020, Iraqi security forces raided Kata'ib Hezbollah base in Dora, southern Baghdad and detained at least 14 militia members.

On 11 October 2020, Kata'ib Hezbollah announced that they have agreed to conditional ceasefire against United States interests in Iraq.

On 26 February 2021, U.S. air strikes hit targets used by the KH militia and other Iranian-backed groups in Syria. These strikes were carried out in retaliation for an attack on a U.S. air base in Erbil on 15 February 2021.

See also 

 Al-Etejah TV (channel owned and operated by Kata'ib Hezbollah)
 Belligerents of the Syrian Civil War
 Holy Shrine Defender
 List of armed groups in the Iraqi Civil War
U.S. Department of State list of Foreign Terrorist Organizations
 Saraya al-Khorasani
 Executive Order 13224

References

External links 

 
 Counter Extremism Project profile
 Kata’ib Hezbollah and the Intricate Web of Iranian Military Involvement in Iraq

Anti-ISIL factions in Iraq
Anti-ISIL factions in Syria
Arab militant groups
Factions in the Iraq War
Hezbollah
Islam-related controversies
Iran–Iraq relations
Iran–Syria relations
Iraqi insurgency (2003–2011)
Islamic Revolutionary Guard Corps
Islamism in Iraq
Islamist groups
Organizations designated as terrorist by the United Arab Emirates
Organizations designated as terrorist by the United States
Organizations based in Asia designated as terrorist
Paramilitary organizations based in Iraq
Popular Mobilization Forces
Pro-government factions of the Syrian civil war
Resistance movements
Khomeinist groups
Terrorism in Iraq
Military units and formations established in 2003
Paramilitary forces of Iraq
Anti-Zionist organizations
Anti-Zionism in Iraq
Anti-Americanism
Jihadist groups in Iraq
Jihadist groups in Syria
Anti-Western sentiment